Anthurium warocqueanum, commonly known as the Queen Anthurium, is a species of plant in the genus Anthurium. Native to Colombia, it is grown in more temperate climates as a greenhouse specimen or houseplant for its ornamental foliage.

Description 
Anthurium warocqueanum is a member of the section Cardiolonchium, or the velvet-leaved Anthuriums, along with species such as A. crystallinum, A. regale, and A. magnificum. 

The leaves range from green to very dark green or almost black, and can grow 3-4 feet long and 15 inches wide. It has a green spathe and spadix, and produces red berries.

History and horticulture 
Named for the Belgian industrialist and horticulturalist Arthur Warocqué (1835-1880), the queen Anthurium was first collected from Colombia in 1874 by Gustav Wallis (along with Anthurium veitchii) during his time working for Veitch Nurseries. Long sought after for its stunning foliage, Anthurium warocqueanum is well known for being difficult to care for, requiring high humidity, indirect light, and well-draining soil.

References

External links

warocqueanum
Plants described in 1878